Chaison may refer to:

Chaison, Michigan, an unincorporated community
Gary Chaison, an American university professor